How to Lose a Guy in 10 Days is a 2003 romantic comedy film directed by Donald Petrie, starring Kate Hudson and Matthew McConaughey. It is based on the picture book of the same name by Michele Alexander and Jeannie Long. The book has no narrative, only a list of comedic dating "don'ts", so the characters and plot were created specifically for the film. In the film, advertising executive Benjamin Barry makes a bet that he can make any woman fall in love with him, while women's magazine writer Andie Anderson plans to write an article about how she led her boyfriend to dump her, putting them at cross-purposes after they choose each other as their romantic partners. Andie employs a number of the dating "don'ts" from the picture book in her efforts to get Ben to break up with her.

Plot
Andie Anderson is a writer for the women's magazine Composure as the subject-matter expert for a series of "How to" articles. She is bored and wishes she could write about more serious topics. Michelle, Andie's friend, experiences yet another break-up, and she becomes despondent and says she is not attractive enough. Andie argues that the problem is rather her needy, excessively emotional behavior with men, and is inspired to write an article titled "How to Lose a Guy in 10 Days" in order to prove her point; she will begin dating a man and drive him away within 10 days simply by imitating Michelle's behavior.

Advertising executive Benjamin Barry is looking to branch out from his usual remit of beer and sports campaigns, and lead a prestigious advertising campaign for a diamond company. At a bar, Ben's boss, Phillip, questions whether Ben has enough insight into the romance typically associated with diamonds. In response, Ben wagers he could make any woman fall in love with him. Phillip says that if he can achieve this before the company ball that will take place in 10 days, he will allow Ben to lead the diamond campaign. Ben's rivals, Judy Spears and Judy Green, were at the Composure magazine offices earlier in the day and know about Andie's task. Seeing Andie at the bar, they pick her as the woman to be romanced by Ben.

Ben and Andie meet and soon start their quests, neither revealing their true intentions. Andie works hard to make Ben first fall for her and then break up with her in order to complete her article, but Ben continues to stick around in hopes of making her fall in love with him. Andie makes Ben miss seeing the final shot in a Knicks game by sending him to get her a soda, gets him knocked out in a movie theater by talking aloud while watching a film, moves her things into his apartment, gets him a fern plant to represent their relationship and a Chinese Crested Dog, and takes him to a Celine Dion concert when he was under the assumption he was going to see a New York Knicks basketball game. However, she also occasionally lets her normal side show, which Ben begins falling for.

Fed up with the project, Andie throws a fit at Ben's boys' poker night to finally drive him to break up with her. However, Ben's friends Tony and Thayer push him to stay the course by proposing couples counseling with Andie. Andie has Michelle pose as a couples therapist and suggest Ben is ashamed of Andie. Ben counters by offering to introduce her to his family in Staten Island that weekend. While visiting the family together, Ben and Andie form a genuine bond. 

Andie and Ben go to the company ball together where Phillip talks with Andie and tells Ben that he "met her, she loves you, you win." To sabotage Ben, Judy and Judy tell Tony and Thayer that Andie knew about the bet all along and was playing along to help Ben win. Tony and Thayer beg Andie to keep quiet, unwittingly making her aware of the bet. Simultaneously, Andie's boss Lana, who is unaware of Ben's role, tells him about Andie's "How To" article. Upon learning of Ben's bet, Andie attempts to humiliate Ben in front of everyone at the party, and the pair argue on stage before breaking up.

Tony shows Ben Andie's subsequent article, in which she explains how she "lost the only guy I've ever fallen for." When he hears she quit her job at Composure (since Lana again refused to let her write about serious topics) and is on her way to Washington, D.C., for an interview, he chases her taxi and stops her. After he accuses her of running away, they reveal their true feelings for each other. Ben instructs the taxi driver to return Andie's belongings to her home - Ben will be taking her now - and then they kiss.

Cast
 Kate Hudson as Andie Anderson
 Matthew McConaughey as Benjamin Barry
 Kathryn Hahn as Michelle
 Annie Parisse as Jeannie
 Adam Goldberg as Tony
 Thomas Lennon as Thayer
 Michael Michele as Judy Spears
 Shalom Harlow as Judy Green
 Robert Klein as Phillip Warren
 Bebe Neuwirth as Lana Jang
 Liliane Montevecchi as Mrs. DeLauer
 Marvin Hamlisch as himself (cameo)

Production
Gwyneth Paltrow and director Mike Newell were originally attached to the project but producer Lynda Obst was unable to get Newell to commit to a date and Paltrow went on to work on the film View from the Top.

The yellow gown Kate Hudson wore in the movie was created by Carolina Herrera along with the film’s costume designer. The necklace she wears with the yellow gown is called, in the film, the "Isadora Diamond" named after Isadora Duncan. The 80-carat yellow diamond in the necklace was designed by Harry Winston and is worth $6 million.

The apartment interiors were conceived by Yeadon born sculptor Zoë Waterman, who said she thought the characters should live in "spaces which I consider to be dream spaces. That is to say their apartments are as close as I've seen on screen to my dream apartment. I just said to myself 'where would I absolutely love to live in my wildest dreams?', and the whole design came together in about fifteen minutes."

Release

Critical response
How to Lose a Guy in 10 Days received mixed reviews from critics. Metacritic gave the film a score of 45 out of 100, based on 31 critics, indicating "mixed or average reviews". Rotten Tomatoes gave the film a rating of 42%, based on 150 reviews, with an average rating of 5/10. The site's critical consensus reads: "Matthew McConaughey and Kate Hudson are charming together, but they can't overcome How to Lose a Guy in 10 Days silly premise and predictable script."

Box office
The film was released on February 7, 2003, and earned $23,774,850 in its first weekend. Its final gross is $105,813,373 in the United States and $71,558,068 internationally.

References

External links

 
 
 

2003 films
2003 romantic comedy films
2000s American films
2000s English-language films
2000s German films
American romantic comedy films
English-language German films
Films about journalists
Films directed by Donald Petrie
Films produced by Robert Evans
Films produced by Lynda Obst
Films scored by David Newman
Films set in a movie theatre
Films set in New York City
Films shot in New York City
Films shot in Toronto
German romantic comedy films
Paramount Pictures films